WEPA or Wepa may refer to:

Western Economic Partnership Agreements
"Wepa", a song by Gloria Estefan
WEPA-LD, a low-power television station (channel 19) licensed to serve Erie, Pennsylvania, United States
WEPA (AM), a defunct radio station in Eupora, Mississippi, United States
WEPA-CD, a defunct low-power television station (channel 16) formerly licensed to serve Pittsburgh, Pennsylvania
WEPA Hygieneprodukte GmbH, a large German producer of tissue paper